Erika Kojima (小嶋 絵里香; born 4 October 1988) is a former wushu taolu athlete from Japan. She won the silver medal at the 2008 Beijing Wushu Tournament, that was held in tandem with the 2008 Summer Olympics, in the women's nanquan event. She won the bronze medal at the 2005 World Wushu Championships, the silver medal at the 2007 World Wushu Championships and became a world champion at the 2011 World Wushu Championships. At the 2009 World Games she won the silver medal. At the 2005 East Asian Games she won the silver medal and became champion at the 2013 East Asian Games.

References

1988 births
Living people
Japanese wushu practitioners
Japanese sportswomen
People from Shiga Prefecture
Competitors at the 2008 Beijing Wushu Tournament
World Games bronze medalists
World Games medalists in wushu
Wushu practitioners at the 2006 Asian Games
Wushu practitioners at the 2014 Asian Games